Dastgerdan Rural District is a rural district (dehestan) in Dastgerdan District, Tabas County, South Khorasan Province, Iran. At the 2006 census, its population was 4,421, in 1,327 families.  The rural district has 59 villages.

References 

Rural Districts of South Khorasan Province
Tabas County